Lorenzo Pollicini (1603–1656) was a Roman Catholic prelate who served as Bishop of Avellino e Frigento (1653–1656).

Biography
Lorenzo Pollicini was born in Bologna, Italy on 9 August 1603.
On 10 November 1653, he was appointed during the papacy of Pope Innocent X as Bishop of Avellino e Frigento.
On 16 November 1653, he was consecrated bishop by Niccolò Albergati-Ludovisi, Cardinal-Priest of Santa Maria degli Angeli e dei Martiri, with Giulio Rospigliosi, Titular Archbishop of Tarsus, and Cristofor Segni, Titular Archbishop of Thessalonica, serving as co-consecrators. 
He served as Bishop of Avellino e Frigento until his death on 7 July 1656.

References

External links and additional sources
 (for Chronology of Bishops) 
 (for Chronology of Bishops) 

17th-century Italian Roman Catholic bishops
Bishops appointed by Pope Innocent X
1603 births
1656 deaths